The siege of Pskov, known as the Pskov Defense in Russia, took place between August 1581 and February 1582, when the army of the Polish king and Grand Duke of Lithuania Stephen Báthory laid an unsuccessful siege and successful blockade of the city of Pskov during the final stage of the Livonian War of 1558–1583.

The first detachments of the Polish–Lithuanian army, which in the  previous two years captured Polotsk (1579) and Velikiye Luki (1580), appeared at the walls of Pskov on August 18, 1581. This action completely cut off Russian forces from the territory of Livonia. The main invading force (31,000 men, Polish, Lithuanian, Hungarian, Bohemian, Wallachian, and German soldiers) laid siege to the city on August 24–26. Prince Vasili Skopin-Shuisky was nominally in charge of the defense of Pskov, but Prince Ivan Shuisky was the one to actually implement it. The latter had up to 4,000 dvoryane, streltsy, and Cossacks and some 12,000 armed citizens of Pskov and its surroundings at his disposal.

After a two-day shelling of Pskov, the Polish army attacked for the first time on September 8. The Russians repelled the assault, which resulted in heavy Polish losses. Attempts to blow up the fortifications with mines and a general attack on November 2 also turned out to be fruitless. In November some Polish forces attacked the Pskovo-Pechorsky Monastery, but to no avail.

King Stephen Báthory then ordered a passive siege, and the battle became a blockade. On December 1 the king left the siege together with most of the Lithuanian army, volunteers, and German, Hungarian, Romanian, Bohemian and Scottish mercenaries. Command of the remaining forces was given to Jan Zamojski. At the same time, during the siege in 1581, Polish cavalry raids devastated many regions of Russia, reaching Volga and Lake Ladoga. The regular cavalry was the best unit of the Polish forces. During the harsh winter of 1581-2 the rest of the besieging army would have mutinied but for the iron will of Chancellor Zamojski. The Chancellor held the blockade, although Russian partisans had been active in the Pskov area, attacking enemy foragers and communications.

The Pskovian garrison undertook frequent sallies (approximately 46), mostly in November and December 1581. There were 31 attacks by Polish troops during the five-month siege. The siege dragged on, with neither side able to end it; in the meantime diplomatic negotiations, in which the Vatican became involved, led to the end of hostilities.

Báthory and Ivan IV finally signed the Treaty of Jam Zapolski on January 15; Russia renounced its claims to Livonia and Polotsk and in exchange the Commonwealth returned Russian territories its armies had captured. On February 4, 1582, the last detachments of the Polish-Lithuanian army left the outskirts of Pskov.

The siege of Pskov is commemorated on the Tomb of the Unknown Soldier, Warsaw, with the inscription "PSKOW 24 VIII 1581-15 I 1582".

See also
Muscovite–Lithuanian Wars

References

The battle in the larger picture is described on the following pages: 1577-1582 War with Muscovy, THE STRUGGLE FOR THE DOMINIUM MAR1S BALTICI
Jasienica, Paweł Rzeczpospolita Obojga Narodów. Srebrny wiek 
A brief account of the siege can be found in *

Conflicts in 1581
Conflicts in 1582
1581 in Europe
1582 in Russia
Pskov
Pskov
Pakov
Pskov
Pskov
Pskov
Military history of Russia
History of Pskov